Tonalism was an artistic style that emerged in the 1880s when American artists began to paint landscape forms with an overall tone of colored atmosphere or mist. Between 1880 and 1915, dark, neutral hues such as gray, brown or blue, often dominated compositions by artists associated with the style. During the late 1890s, American art critics began to use the term "tonal" to describe these works, as well as the lesser-known synonyms Quietism and Intimism. Two of the leading associated painters were George Inness and  James McNeill Whistler.

Tonalism is sometimes used to describe American landscapes derived from the French Barbizon style, which emphasized mood and shadow. Tonalism was eventually eclipsed by Impressionism and European modernism.

Australian Tonalism emerged as an art movement in Melbourne during the 1910s.

Associated artists 

 Willis Seaver Adams
 Joseph Allworthy
 Edward Mitchell Bannister
 Clarice Beckett
 Ralph Albert Blakelock
 Emanuele Cavalli
 Jean-Charles Cazin
 Colin Colahan
 Paul Cornoyer
 Bruce Crane
 Leon Dabo
 Elliott Daingerfield
 Angel De Cora
 Charles Melville Dewey
 Thomas Dewing
 Charles Warren Eaton
 Henry Farrer
 Edith Loring Getchell
 Percy Gray
 L. Birge Harrison
 Arthur Hoeber
 George Inness
 William Keith
 Percy Leason
 Xavier Martinez
 Arthur Frank Mathews
 Max Meldrum
 Robert Crannell Minor
 John Francis Murphy
 Frank Nuderscher
 Fausto Pirandello
 Henry Ward Ranger
 Granville Redmond
 Albert Pinkham Ryder
 William Sartain
 Edward Steichen
 Dwight William Tryon
 John Twachtman
 Clark Greenwood Voorhees
 James McNeill Whistler
 Alexander Helwig Wyant
 Raymond Dabb Yelland

Gallery

See also 
 California Tonalism
 Australian Tonalism

Notes

External links 
American Paintings in The Metropolitan Museum of Art, a fully digitized 3 volume exhibition catalog
 American Tonalism - Montclair Art Museum

 
Art movements
 Tonalism
Impressionism
American art movements